Sam Colson (born March 24, 1951, born in Beloit, Kansas) is a former javelin thrower who competed in the 1976 Summer Olympics where he finished fifth.

In 1985, Colson was indicted for his involvement in the Clemson University steroid scandal. At the time, Colson was the strength and conditioning coach and women's track coach for Clemson. Along with the men's track coach Stan Narewski, Colson pleaded guilty to providing prescription drugs, including steroids, to student athletes at Clemson.

References

External links
 

1951 births
Living people
American male javelin throwers
Olympic track and field athletes of the United States
Athletes (track and field) at the 1976 Summer Olympics
Pan American Games medalists in athletics (track and field)
Pan American Games gold medalists for the United States
People from Beloit, Kansas
Athletes (track and field) at the 1975 Pan American Games
Medalists at the 1975 Pan American Games